Julia Evangeline Brooks (June, 1882 – November 24, 1948) was an incorporator of Alpha Kappa Alpha Sorority, Incorporated, the first sorority founded by African-American women. The sorority has continued to generate social capital for nearly 100 years.

Having earned a B.A. degree at Howard University and M.A. at Columbia University, Brooks was a devoted educator for the rest of her life. She worked most of her life at the academic, prestigious Dunbar High School in Washington, DC. She was an assistant principal there for 26 years, and also served as dean of girls. These were unusual positions of authority for any woman of that time. Brooks inspired generations of students.

Early life
Julia was one of ten children born to Walter Henderson Brooks and Eva Holmes Brooks in New Orleans, Louisiana. Her father, a slave as a child, grabbed at the chance for education, earning B.A. and theology degrees from Lincoln University in Oxford, Pennsylvania in 1873. He became the pastor of Nineteenth Street Baptist Church in Washington, DC.

During her youth, Julia attended public schools in Washington, D.C. Julia was enrolled at Sumner Magruder Elementary School and M Street High School.  This was the academic high school for African Americans in Washington, named in 1916 for the poet Paul Laurence Dunbar. It had an illustrious faculty and high standards, and attracted the best students from Washington and other cities in the South.

After graduating high school, Julia Brooks enrolled in Miner Normal School, a training school for teachers. She taught primary school for a few years, then Brooks went on to Howard University for more education.  It was one of the top two historically black colleges in the nation, at a time when only 1/3 of 1% of African Americans and 5% of whites of eligible age attended any college.

College life and incorporation of Alpha Kappa Alpha

Brooks was one of several members who were early supporters of the idea of incorporating Alpha Kappa Alpha to provide for its future expansion.  As a result, Brooks, Nellie Quander, Norma Boyd, Nellie Pratt Russell, Minnie B. Smith and Ethel Jones Mowbray incorporated Alpha Kappa Alpha on January 29, 1913. 
Brooks and the other incorporators, were listed by name in Article Four of the sorority's Certificate of Incorporation. After incorporation, Julia served as treasurer of the directorate until 1923.

Career and later life
After graduation from Howard University with a B.A. degree in 1916, Brooks was qualified to teach at the high school level. She taught Spanish and English for six years at Washington D.C.'s prestigious Dunbar High School. Brooks went on to graduate study during summers at Columbia University in New York City and received her Master of Arts in 1928.

Brooks devoted her life to education. Beginning in 1922, Julia Brooks was promoted to assistant principal at Dunbar High School, the academic high school for African Americans. This was an unusual position of authority for any woman and made her prominent in the Washington educational community. Brooks served in this position for 26 years, through the rest of her life. She was also appointed Dean of Girls. Because the District was run as part of the Federal government, African-American teachers in the public schools were paid on the same scale as whites. The city attracted outstanding teachers.

Brooks directly assisted six nieces and nephews with obtaining a college education by support, taking them to special events, tutoring when necessary, and contributing financially.

She was a charter member of Xi Omega chapter of Alpha Kappa Alpha in Washington, D.C., established in 1923. Julia Brooks wrote an early history of the sorority, which she gave at the 1923 Boulé in Baltimore, Maryland. At Founders' Day at Xi Omega on January 30, 1924, the history was presented as a  lecture. Julia Brooks died on November 24, 1948.

References

External links
Julia Evangeline Brooks Biography at Virginia Commonwealth University

Howard University alumni
1882 births
1948 deaths
People from New Orleans
Alpha Kappa Alpha founders
African-American women academics
American women academics
20th-century American educators
Lincoln University (Pennsylvania) alumni
African-American academics
20th-century American women educators
20th-century African-American women
20th-century African-American people
20th-century African-American educators